Gustav Peter Blom (4 July 1785 – 28 October 1869) was a Norwegian civil servant, politician and historian. He was a member of the Norwegian Constitutional Assembly at Eidsvoll during  1814.

Blom was born at Hurum in Buskerud,  Norway.  Blom took his law degree in 1807 and  worked as district stipendiary magistrate (sorenskriver) in Nordre Jarlsberg. He was later appointed stipendiary magistrate (byfoged) and town clerk (byskriver) in Drammen. While stationed there, he was elected to the Norwegian Parliament in 1830.

He was later County Governor of Buskerud Amt (now Buskerud) from 1831 to 1857. While serving in this capacity, he was also elected to the Norwegian Parliament in 1833, 1836, 1839, 1842 and 1848. From 15 July to 18 July 1852 and from 11 October 1852 to 12 April 1853 he was an acting member of the Council of State Division in interim in Stockholm, founded during King Oscar I's absence.

References

1788 births
1843 deaths
Norwegian jurists
Fathers of the Constitution of Norway
County governors of Norway
Members of the Storting
Buskerud politicians
People from Drammen
People from Hurum
Government ministers of Norway